Hvosno ("thick wood") was a medieval Serbian county located in the northern part of the Metohija region, in what is today Kosovo. It roughly encompassed the areas of the modern Istog and Peja municipalities. It was surrounded by the counties of Jelci to the north; Budimlja and Plav to the west; Zatrnava to the south; Draškovina and Podrimlje to the east and southeast.

Name
The name of Hvosno is derived from the Old Slavic word hvost, meaning 'thick wood', probably due to dense forests that grow on the slopes of surrounding mountains. Several of the oldest toponyms in the area have parallels in the Czech Republic (Trebovitić–Trebovetice, Ljutoglav–Litohlavy and Drsnik–Drsník), showing that it was inhabited by Slavs.

History
Hvosno, as Hosnos was mentioned in three charters of Emperor Basil II (r. 960–1025) as being under the jurisdiction of the Eparchy of Prizren. During 11th and 12th century, Eparchy of Prizren (including Hvosno) was under jurisdiction of the Eastern Orthodox Archbishopric of Ohrid.
Serbian Grand Prince Stefan Nemanja (r. 1169–1196) managed to gain full independence from the Byzantines and started to expand his domain, capturing Hvosno among other territories. Hvosno was mentioned in the Life of Saint Simeon, written between 1201 and 1208 by his son and first Serbian archbishop Saint Sava, as one of the districts that Serbian Grand župan Stefan Nemanja (Saint Simeon) conquered from the Byzantine Empire between 1180 and 1190. Archbishop Sava mentioned Hvosno as one of Stefan Nemanja's "grandfather's land" which he recaptured It appears that beside the župa (county) of Hvosno there was also a larger territory called zemlja (lit. "land") of Hvosno which encompassed the župa of Hvosno and some of the surrounding ones: Kujavča, Zatrnava, Podrimlje and Kostrc. The zemlja of Hvosno later corresponded to the territorial spread of the bishopric of Hvosno. Nemanja gave the rule of Hvosno to his elder son Vukan, who in 1195 is titled as "King of Duklja, Dalmatia, Travunia, Toplica and Hvosno" (Velcani, regis Diokle, Dalmatie, Tripunie, Toplize et Cosne).

Annotations

References

Sources
 
 

Subdivisions of Serbia in the Middle Ages
Historical regions in Kosovo
Nemanjić dynasty
History of the Serbian Orthodox Church
Kingdom of Serbia (medieval)
Grand Principality of Serbia